Motswana is the singular form of Batswana, and may refer to:
 A member of the Tswana people, an ethnic group in southern Africa
 A citizen of Botswana of any ethnic background